Pavel Blažek (born 8 April 1969) is a Czech politician, who has served as Minister of Justice of the Czech Republic since 2021, a post he previously held from July 2012 to July 2013 in Cabinet of Petr Nečas. He has been a Member of the Chamber of Deputies (MP) since 26 October 2013.

References

1969 births
Living people
Politicians from Brno
Civic Democratic Party (Czech Republic) MPs
Justice ministers of the Czech Republic
Civic Democratic Party (Czech Republic) Government ministers
Members of the Chamber of Deputies of the Czech Republic (2017–2021)
Members of the Chamber of Deputies of the Czech Republic (2013–2017)
Members of the Chamber of Deputies of the Czech Republic (2021–2025)
Masaryk University alumni